Fauna is a collective term for animal life.

Fauna may also refer to:
Fauna (deity), an ancient Roman goddess
Fauna, Bloemfontein, a suburb of the South African city of Bloemfontein
Fauna (Oh Land album), a 2008 album by Oh Land
Fauna (Haken album), a 2023 album by Haken
Fauna (film), a 2020 Mexican/Canadian drama film
Fauna, a fictional character from Disney's Sleeping Beauty, see Flora, Fauna, and Merryweather
Fauna, a 2009 Spiel des Jahres-nominated board game
Fauna, a female character in Sweet Thursday, a novel by John Steinbeck
Florian-Ayala Fauna, American artist, musician, and music producer
Ceres Fauna, VTuber for Hololive English

See also
Avifauna (disambiguation)